Lilla Hellesen (13 October 1902 – 28 October 1963) was a Norwegian painter.

Biography
She was born in Oslo, Norway as the daughter of the doctor Engel Emil Herman Hellesen and actress Marie Mejlænder. Hellesen studied at the Norwegian National Academy of Craft and Art Industry 1921–22 and the Norwegian National Academy of Fine Arts in Oslo 1922–25. She participated in the  Autumn Exhibition from 1924 to 1962. She made her her  debut at the Salon (Paris) in 1927. She exhibited at the Clerie de la Toison d'Or in Brussels, at Les Femmes Artistes d'Europe in Paris in 1937, and at the Riverside Museum in New York City in 1940, as well as at Victoria and Albert Museum in London in 1938.

Her work was part of the painting event in the art competition at the 1948 Summer Olympics. Her work is represented at the National Museum of Art, Architecture and Design in Oslo, the British Museum, the Bibliothèque nationale de France and the National Gallery of Denmark in Copenhagen.

References

1902 births
1963 deaths
20th-century Norwegian painters
Norwegian women painters
Olympic competitors in art competitions
Artists from Oslo